Bojan Aleksandrović (born 5 January 1977) is a Timok Vlach priest who in 2004 successfully defied the Serbian authorities to build a Romanian Orthodox church in Malajnica, the first Romanian Orthodox Church in the Timok Valley in two centuries. He has since established at least four other sites for future churches. Aleksandrović is pastor of the Romanian Orthodox community in Malajnica and Remesiana, Serbia, and protopresbyter of Dacia Ripensis.

Awards 
 Order of Cultural Merit

See also
Diocese of Dacia Felix

References

Serbian people of Romanian descent
Vlachs of Serbia
Romanian Orthodox priests
Eastern Orthodox Christians from Serbia
Romanian Orthodox Church in Serbia
People from Negotin
1977 births
Living people
Serbian human rights activists
Recipients of the Order of Cultural Merit (Romania)